The 1983 Augustana (Illinois) Vikings football team was an American football team that represented Augustana College as a member of the College Conference of Illinois and Wisconsin (CCIW) during the 1983 NCAA Division III football season. In their fifth season under head coach Bob Reade, the Vikings compiled a perfect 12–0 record and won the CCIW championship. It was the first of four consecutive national championships.

The team's statistical leaders included quarterback Jay Penney with 905 passing yards, halfback Craig Allison with 1,223 rushing yards and 102 points scored, wingback George Velasquez with 1,110 rushing yards, and Norm Singbush with 537 receiving yards. 

They played their home games at Ericson Field in Rock Island, Illinois.

Schedule

References

Augustana
Augustana (Illinois) Vikings football seasons
NCAA Division III Football Champions
College football undefeated seasons
Augustana (Illinois) Vikings football